Sherathang is a town in Gangtok district near the Nathula Pass in Sikkim, India. The location has been identified as the site for excise, customs and checking for trade between India and China. Rinqingang is the corresponding location in China.

Sherathang has an Indo-Tibetan Border Police border post, which is one of the India-China Border Personnel Meeting point (BPM point). A regular scheduled international mail exchange between India Post and China takes place here twice a week. There is a war memorial at Sherathang to commemorate the Indian Army's martyrs and war heroes of 1967 Nathu La and Cho La clashes.

Border crossing 

Sherathang in India and Rinchengang in Tibet are the designated India-China border trade marts for the local cross-border trade. In 2003, the governments of India and China agreed to use these locations as designated border trade mart.

Sherathang border post is also a mail exchange point between India Post and China. On Indian side, the mail from mainland India is received at India Post’s Siliguri office, send to Indian Army's Upper Tadong-based 77 Field post office, "The mail, mostly letters are vetted and then sealed in a bag and a manifest issued for the Chinese post office at Yathung in Tibet’s Chumbi Valley is sent to the India Post’s Gangtok head office, from where the sealed bag is collected by the Sherathang postman. While the mail exchange on the Indian side of the border takes place every Sunday, the exchange on the Chinese side takes place every Thursday."

Infrastructure 

Power Department, Government of Sikkim has recently commissioned 2X5 MVA, 66/11KV, Sherathang sub-station in the presence of Mr Phigu T. Bhutia, Principal Chief Engineer and his team of other senior officers which is the highest altitude permanent power sub-station in India and second in the world at an altitude of 13,600 feet. The substation was installed as part of the Central Government’s ‘24×7 power for all’ initiative, which aims to meet the electricity needs to many far-flung corners of the country including the troops stationed at the border areas. Workers had to cope with the high altitude, low temperatures, lack of oxygen and intense ultraviolet rays. Geographical remoteness and extreme weather, frequent blizzards and wide-ranging temperatures – between -10 and 20 C in the summer – make managing a power station a herculean task.

Sherathang Trade Mart has the highest altitude permanent internet café in the world, at an altitude of 13,600 feet. It was added to the Limca Book of Records 2007. This internet café also doubles as a photographic studio, provides scanning and faxing facilities. Internet charges are at a nominal Rs. 20 per hour. Free training courses are also given here. The café was set up by the Community Information Centre (CIC) of the Sikkim Information Technology (IT) department and inaugurated by the Chief Secretary of the hill state, N.D. Chingapa, on 21 April 2006. It is frequented by students, traders, tourists and army personnel since it is just 8 km below the Nathu La Pass.

See also 
 Border Personnel Meeting point

References

Bibliography
 
 

Cities and towns in Gangtok district